Thuận Nam may refer to several places in Vietnam:

Thuận Nam District, a rural district of Ninh Thuận Province
Thuận Nam, Bình Thuận, a township and capital of Hàm Thuận Nam District